Paul Cleary may refer to:

 Paul Cleary (American football) (1922–1996), American football end
 Paul Cleary (athlete) (born 1976), Australian retired middle-distance runner